Maiken With Pape (born 20 February 1978) is a retired Danish international football striker and former professional tennis player.

In January 2009 she signed to play for Stabæk in Norway. She has previously played for Brøndby.

Career statistics
Statistics accurate as of match played 8 June 2013

Tennis

Pape also has a career high WTA doubles ranking of 484 achieved on 15 December 1997. Pape has won 4 ITF doubles titles. Pape was in the early 1990s, with moderate success, a professional tennis player.

Pape retirement from professional Tennis career in 1999.

ITF Circuit finals

Doubles Finals: 5 (4-1)

Personal life
Pape is in a relationship with fellow former football player, Katrine Pedersen.

External links

References

Danish Football Union (DBU) statistics

1978 births
Living people
Danish women's footballers
Danish female tennis players
Denmark women's international footballers
Stabæk Fotball Kvinner players
Brøndby IF (women) players
Women's association football forwards
2007 FIFA Women's World Cup players
Lesbian sportswomen
Danish lesbians
LGBT association football players
Danish LGBT sportspeople